Balf is a town in Hungary, a district of Sopron.  It has approximately 1,000 inhabitants.

References

External links
https://www.memorialmuseums.org/eng/denkmaeler/view/1608/National-memorial-site-to-the-victims-of-the-Balf-camp

Sopron
Former municipalities of Hungary